Michael Greenberg may refer to:

 Michael Greenberg (economist) (1914–1992), scholar of Chinese economics and history
 Michael E. Greenberg (born 1954), American neuroscientist
 Michael Greenberg (writer) (born 1952), author of Hurry Down Sunshine
 Michael Greenberg (lawyer), American lawyer
 Mike Greenberg (born 1967), television show host